Yaacov Choueka (Hebrew:יעקב שויקה, שוויכה 1936 - 2020) was a professor in the Department of Computer Science at Bar-Ilan University, where he served as head of the institute for Information Retrieval and Computational Linguistics.   Until 2017, he headed Genazim - the computer unit of the Friedberg project for the study of the Genizah. His areas of expertise included systems for retrieving textual information, large textual databases, computerized processing of natural languages, especially in Hebrew, computer analysis of text, computerized dictionaries, mechanized morphology and syntax, and in electronic publishing.

He played leadership roles in:
 The Bar Ilan Responsa Project
 Friedberg Geniza Project
 "Hachi Garsinan" Talmud Bavli Variants
 Rav-Milim Dictionary

In 2019 he won the Katz Prize for his contribution to the study of halakha in its application in modern life.

References 

Mizrahi Jews
Israeli computer scientists